Mann Yadanarpon Airlines Company Limited is a privately owned domestic airline based in Mandalay, Myanmar. The airline began operations in February 2014. The airline also offers charter services and is planning to commence regional services to Thailand.

Destinations 
 Myanmar
 Mandalay - Mandalay International Airport
 Yangon - Yangon International Airport
 Bagan - Nyaung U Airport
 Heho - Heho Airport
 Thandwe - Thandwe Airport
 Kengtung - Kengtung Airport
 Tachilek - Tachilek Airport
 Lashio - Lashio Airport
 Myeik - Myeik Airport
 Dawei - Dawei Airport
 Kawthaung - Kawthaung Airport
 Myitkyina - Myitkyina Airport
 Sittwe - Sittwe Airport
 Mawlamyaing - Mawlamyaing Airport
 Hkamti, Myanmar - Khamti Airport

Codeshare agreements
Mann Yadanarpon Airlines has codeshare agreements with the following airlines:
 Myanmar National Airlines

Fleet

Current fleet

The Mann Yadanarpon Airlines fleet comprises the following aircraft (as of August 2019):

Former fleet
The airline previously operated the following aircraft (as of August 2018):
 1 further ATR 72-600

References

External links

Airlines established in 2014
Airlines of Myanmar
2014 establishments in Myanmar